The 1977 European Ladies' Team Championship took place 6–10 July at Real Club de Golf Sotogrande in Sotogrande, Province of Cádiz, Spain. It was the tenth women's golf amateur European Ladies' Team Championship.

Venue 
The hosting club was founded in 1964 and the course was designed by Robert Trent Jones. It had previously hosted the men's professional Open de España in 1966. In 1994, His Majesty King Juan Carlos I granted to Sotogrande the title of Real.

The championship course was set up with par 72.

Format 
All participating teams played two qualification rounds of stroke-play with up to five players, counted the four best scores for each team.

The eight best teams formed flight A, in knock-out match-play over the next three days. The teams were seeded based on their positions after the stroke-play. The first placed team was drawn to play the quarter final against the eight placed team, the second against the seventh, the third against the sixth and the fourth against the fifth. In each match between two nation teams, two 18-hole foursome games and five 18-hole single games were played. Teams were allowed to switch players during the team matches, selecting other players in to the afternoon single games after the morning foursome games. Games all square after 18 holes were declared halved, if the team match was already decided.

The six teams placed 9–14 in the qualification stroke-play formed Flight B, to play similar knock-out play to decide their final positions.

Teams 
14 nation teams contested the event. Each team consisted of a minimum of four players.

Players in the leading teams

Other participating teams

Winners 
Host nation Spain won the opening 36-hole competition, with a score of 28 over par 604, five strokes ahead of team England. Defending champions France finished another three strokes back on third place.

Individual leader in the opening 36-hole stroke-play qualifying competition was Cristina Marsans, Spain, with a score of 3-under-par 141, six strokes ahead of Vanessa Marvin, England, and Anna Skanse Dönnestad, Sweden. With her score of 69 in the second round, Marsans was the only player with a round under par. 

Louise Van den Berghe, Belgium, made a hole-in-one on the par 3, 110 meters, 17th hole during the first round of the stroke-play competition.

Team England won the championship, earning their fifth title, beating Spain in the final 6–1. Team Sweden, earned third place, finishing on the podium for the fourth time, beating Scotland 4–2 in the third place match.

Results 

Qualification round

Team standings

* Note: In the event of a tie the order was determined by the better non-counting score.

Individual leaders

 Note: There was no official award for the lowest individual score.

Flight A

Bracket

Final games

Flight B

Bracket

Final standings

Sources:

See also 
 Espirito Santo Trophy – biennial world amateur team golf championship for women organized by the International Golf Federation.
 European Amateur Team Championship – European amateur team golf championship for men organised by the European Golf Association.

References

External links 
 European Golf Association: Results

European Ladies' Team Championship
Golf tournaments in Spain
European Ladies' Team Championship
European Ladies' Team Championship
European Ladies' Team Championship